Himmler is a German surname.  Notable people with the surname include:

 Ernst Hermann Himmler (1905–1945), German Nazi functionary and younger brother of Heinrich Himmler
 Gebhard Ludwig Himmler (1898–1989), German Nazi functionary and older brother of Heinrich Himmler
 Gudrun Burwitz, née Himmler (1929–2018), daughter of Heinrich Himmler
 Heinrich Himmler (1900–1945), Reichsführer of the Schutzstaffel (SS), a military commander, and a leading member of the Nazi Party (NSDAP) of Nazi Germany
 Katrin Himmler (born 1967), a German author, the granddaughter of Ernst Hermann Himmler, great-niece of Heinrich Himmler
 Margarete Himmler (1893–1967), wife of Heinrich Himmler

See also 
 Operation Himmler (less often known as: Operation Konserve, Operation Canned Goods), a Nazi Germany false flag project

German-language surnames